Jhala (Hindi: झाला) is a term in Hindustani classical music which denotes the fast-paced conclusions of classical compositions or raga. It is often characterized by the overwhelming of the melodic component by the rhythmic component. This is sometimes effected by the rapid striking together of the chikari between notes.

References 

Hindustani music terminology
Formal sections in music analysis